Santameri (Σανταμέρι) or Santomeri (Σαντομέρι) may refer to places in Greece:

Santomeri, a village in Achaea 
Mount Skollis, a mountain in Achaea formerly known as Santameri
Santameri Castle, a castle and an ancient city in Achaea
Santameri Castle (Thebes), a castle in Thebes